Balthazar Bourke was an Irish soldier and Knight of Santiago, fl. 1607.

Balthazar Bourke was the son and heir of the Mac William Bourke of County Mayo. In 1607, he was made a knight of Santiago. Baptized Walter, his name was adapted to overcome pronunciation difficulties for the Spanish.

External links
 http://www.ucc.ie/celt/published/T100077/index.html

Irish soldiers in the Spanish Army
17th-century Irish people
People from County Mayo
People of Elizabethan Ireland